KWBF may refer to:

 KDXE (FM), a radio station (101.1 FM) licensed to serve Cammack Village, Arkansas, United States, which held the call sign KWBF-FM from 2005 to 2009
 KARZ-TV, a television station (channel 42) licensed to serve Little Rock, Arkansas, which formerly held the KWBF callsign.